The Jacob K. Javits Convention Center, commonly known as the Javits Center, is a large convention center on Eleventh Avenue between 34th Street and 38th Street in Hell's Kitchen, Manhattan, New York City.  It was designed by architect James Ingo Freed of Pei Cobb Freed & Partners.  The space frame structure was constructed from 1980 to 1986 and was named to honor Jacob Javits, the United States Senator for New York. When the Javits Center opened, it replaced the New York Coliseum at Columbus Circle as the city's major convention facility; the Coliseum was subsequently demolished and replaced by Time Warner Center.

The Javits Center is operated and maintained by the New York Convention Center Operating Corporation, a New York State public-benefit corporation. It is billed as one of the busiest convention centers in the United States. It has undergone expansions throughout its history, with the most recent expansion being completed in 2021 and adding 1.2 million square feet to the building. Plans have also been made for the Javits Center to have panels providing solar power.

Organization
The New York Convention Center Operating Corporation (NYCCOC) - not to be confused with the New York Convention Center Development Corporation ("CCDC"), which is a subsidiary of New York State Urban Development Corporation, dba Empire State Development ("ESD") - operates the Javits Center. NYCCOC's management team is headed by President and CEO Alan Steel. There is a 16-member board that provides guidance. In 2017, NYCCOC had operating expenses of $194 million and employed 3,786 people.

Use and components 
Javits Center has hosted annual events such as the New York International Auto Show the New York Comic Con, and Anime NYC. In November 2016, it was the location of Hillary Clinton's 2016 United States presidential election watching venue.

Its events have included:
  Upper Exhibition Hall
  Lower Exhibition Hall
  Special Events Hall (seating capacity 3,800), 102 meeting rooms
  cafeteria/restaurant/lounge
  concourse
  Crystal Palace
  Galleria
  River Pavilion
 50 loading docks on two levels
  public plaza with water walls and pedestrian link under 11th Avenue
  of surface parking for 140 cars

The Javits Center added  following a major expansion project which was completed in May 2021. This included  of contiguous event space, which will help the facility attract international business conferences.

Early history

Planning 

Planning and constructing a convention center on Manhattan's west side has had a long and controversial history. Proposals for a convention center to replace the New York Coliseum on Columbus Circle date to 1962, only six years after the Coliseum was completed.  A new convention center over the river between 38th and 42nd Streets was included in the City's 1962 plan for the West Side waterfront.  Several other sites were subsequently studied, including the New York Central rail yard between Tenth and Eleventh Avenues (now known as the Eastern Rail Yard site at Hudson Yards) and the west 50s between Eighth and Ninth avenues.

Eventually the Lindsay administration included a new convention center between 10th and 11th avenues in the west 40s along with an extensive redevelopment of the West Side in their 1969–70 Plan for New York City. Opposition to the massive residential displacement that this development project would have caused, and the failure of the City to complete any replacement housing, led the State Legislature to kill the convention center proposal in 1970.  The City then moved the convention center site to the Hudson River, in place of Piers 84 and 86, despite the high cost of foundations and the lack of space for future expansion.  That 44th Street convention center, designed by Gordon Bunshaft of Skidmore, Owings & Merrill, was approved by the Board of Estimate in 1973 despite renewed opposition from the local community. In exchange, the community received a special zoning district that offered some protection from development.

However the 44th Street convention center was never built because of the City's near bankruptcy in 1975, which led instead to a search by the City and State for a less expensive site with some opportunity for expansion. Three sites were proposed — the Penn Central rail yard between 11th and 12th Avenues north of 34th Street; Battery Park City; and in the west 40s near Times Square, somewhere between 6th and 7th Avenues or 7th and 8th Avenues. The Battery Park City site was rejected because it was considered to be too far from midtown hotels. The Times Square plan, by the Regional Plan Association, was not seriously considered by the City.

The rail yard site was originally proposed by the local community to avoid direct residential displacement that would be caused by office and residential development associated with the convention center.  As an alternative to forestall the negative impacts of both, Daniel Gutman, an environmental planner working with the Clinton Planning Council, proposed that the convention center and all major development be located south of 42nd Street. Their proposed convention center site — between Eleventh and Twelfth avenues from 34th to 39th streets — was later promoted by Donald Trump, who had obtained an option on the rail yard from the bankrupt Penn Central in 1975. The City and State eventually chose the rail yard site. Although Trump's offer to build the Convention Center was rejected, he was paid a broker's commission by Penn Central.

Construction

In March 1979, the New York State Legislature approved a plan to allocate $375 million toward the construction of the convention center near the Penn Central yard. The next month, the architectural firm I. M. Pei and Partners was selected to build the New York Convention and Exhibition Center, as it was called at that time. Immediately after the center's construction was announced, real estate prices in the area increased. Properties that previously had trouble selling suddenly had several potential buyers, spurring real estate speculation. Designs for the center were revealed in December 1979. In March 1980, a few squatters on the site were evicted so the site's structures could be demolished to make room for the New York Convention Center. The ground-breaking ceremony for the center was held on June 18 of that year. In October 1980, the MTA issued $100 million in bonds to pay for the center's construction.

The New York Convention Center Development Corporation (CCDC), which was building the Convention Center, proposed building a promenade with restaurants and shops on the building's west side, facing the Hudson River shore. It would also be open year-round, as opposed to other convention centers. At the time, the presence of the Convention Center was supposed to garner $82 million in annual city and state taxes, and the events at the center would allow the city to net $832 million annually. However, a report commissioned by the CCDC found that the center's benefits to the surrounding neighborhood would be reduced due to a lack of public transit and the predominantly industrial zoning of the area. Jerry Lowery was hired to find conventions to host at the New York Convention Center. By late 1981, he had booked 171 conventions for the Convention Center between mid-1984 and late 1986.

The problems with the center's construction started in 1982, when it was revealed that there were difficulties in manufacturing the custom parts for the Convention Center's structure. In March 1983, officials stated that the Convention Center was facing cost overruns of at least $16.8 million. The next month, officials announced that the cost overruns had risen to between $25 million and $50 million, and that the center's opening had been postponed to at least 1985. In order to reduce the delay, workers were ordered to speed up construction. Lowery described the delay as "disastrous" for the city, since the delays left the city vulnerable to lawsuits from the hosts of the 141 conventions that were scheduled to be hosted at the Convention Center through the end of 1985.

By April 1984, the opening date had been delayed further to mid-1986. At the time, Governor Mario Cuomo stated that the center would have a new name by the time it opened. He said, "It should be reasonably utterable and easy to write. It should be a name that's going to identify it with New York as much as possible." In December 1984, at Cuomo's suggestion, the CCDC officially renamed the New York Convention Center to honor former Senator Jacob K. Javits. The Javits Center was topped out on December 19, 1984.

The center was opened on April 3, 1986. The opening of the Javits Center was accompanied by a five-minute ribbon-cutting ceremony. The first exhibitions to be hosted at the Javits Center were the International Fur Fair and an Art Expo of "emerging younger artists". A week later, a formal ribbon-cutting was held, with Governor Cuomo, Mayor Ed Koch, and Javits's widow Marian Javits in attendance.

Mafia charges

In 1995, the Independent Review Board charged that jobs at the center had come under Mafia control. A New York Times article stated:

Expansions

2006–2010 expansion 

On October 16, 2006, a groundbreaking ceremony was held to mark the symbolic start of a $1.7 billion expansion project. The project, which would have expanded the center's size by 45 percent, was scheduled for completion by 2010. Architect Richard Rogers led the design team, and Leslie E. Robertson Associates were the structural engineers. However, the physical constraints on the project site imposed by the Bloomberg administration complicated the design and caused the cost to soar to $5 billion. To address the site constraint, an alternative plan produced in 2007 by Meta Brunzema, an architect, and Daniel Gutman, an environmental planner, for the Hell's Kitchen Neighborhood Association would have expanded the Javits Center south over the Western Rail Yard, the site of the defeated West Side Stadium. Other features of the HKNA plan included an rooftop park, office and residential towers at the corners of the new exhibition hall, and conversion of Pier 76 to public use. In the end, the mayor proposed rezoning the Western Rail Yard site for commercial and residential development as part of the Hudson Yards.

In April 2008, Governor David Paterson decided to renovate the existing Javits building with a severely revised budget of $465 million. The renovation, started in 2010, was led by design team FXFOWLE Epstein, whose redesign of the Javits Center's interior focused on upgrading organization and efficiency, as well as occupant comfort. The more transparent curtain wall, less opaque skylight systems, and light gray paint on the space frame have dramatically transformed the voluminous public spaces. New mechanical systems have improved the indoor air quality, reduced ambient noise, and significantly saved on energy consumption. The diamond-patterned Tuscan red terrazzo of the original floor has been replaced with soft tones of gray terrazzo. This allowed for the introduction of more transparent glass with minimal structurally glazed mullions. Solid stainless steel panels replaced the opaque portions of glass to better express the building's functionality. The roof of the new expansion was also made "green" by the presence of a garden in the new wing's roof. The renovation was completed in November 2013. The expansion was meant to retain old tenants coming back annually, such as the New York Boat Show. In January 2014, it was revealed that the new roof was still leaking after the expansion.

In January 2012, Governor Andrew Cuomo announced plans to construct a new convention center on the site of Aqueduct Racetrack in Queens and redevelop the Javits Center site with a mix of commercial space and apartments, similar to Battery Park City. However, Cuomo's plan was quickly scuttled due to disagreements over space in the Aqueduct Racetrack area. More Javits Center renovations are being eyed, with $15 million already going toward a new telephone system and improved Wi-Fi network in the building, as well as a truck idling area to the west and south being proposed for further expansion.

The newly expanded Javits Center is served by the New York City Subway  at the 34th Street–Hudson Yards station, which was built as part of the 7 Subway Extension in anticipation for the adjoining Hudson Yards Redevelopment Project. The station opened on September 13, 2015. The expanded Javits Center, along with the completed High Line, the new Hudson Park and Boulevard, and the subway extension, are facilitating the development of Hudson Yards.

2016–2021 expansion 
Javits North, a "semi-permanent structure" at the north end, would be demolished and replaced by a new glass building with "meeting rooms, new exhibition halls and outdoor space". The consortium chosen is made up of project manager Lend Lease Group and Turner Construction Company, a subsidiary of Hochtief which is controlled by Spanish company ACS Group. The expansion was intended to make Javits Center a more competitive location for conventions and events compared to other cities' convention centers. There were also no hotels near Javits Center, which led some convention planners to decide against holding their events there. A groundbreaking ceremony was held in March 2017. Initially, the expansion was scheduled to be completed in March 2021.
In March 2020, amid the COVID-19 pandemic in New York City, the Javits Center was adapted for use as a temporary 2,000-bed alternate care site to treat COVID-19 patients, though the number of beds was later expanded to 2,910. The field hospital was ultimately little-used. A total of slightly under 1,100 COVID-19 patients were treated at the Javits Center. The field hospital, administered by FEMA, closed in May 2020 after one surge of New York City cases passed; the few dozen patients remaining were transferred to other hospitals in the city. The facilities were not completely dismantled, in case they were needed for a subsequent wave. In 2021, the Javits Center was used as a COVID-19 mass vaccination site; on three consecutive days in March 2021, the location set a national record for number of vaccinations administered in a single day (reaching up to 14,000 people).

The COVID-19 pandemic had started just as the Javits Center expansion was being completed. All of the large conventions scheduled to take place between March 2020 and mid-2021 were canceled or postponed because of Javits Center's use as a field hospital and then a vaccination site. The pandemic resulted in a loss of about $200 million in expected profits. Even so, the Javits Center expansion was only delayed by two months. Construction of the expansion was completed within budget on May 11, 2021. Plans were made to construct 3,000 solar panels on the new and existing roofs of the building as well.

See also
 Albany Convention Center
 Battery Park City Authority
 Empire State Development Corporation
 Hudson River Park Trust
 Olympic Regional Development Authority
 United Nations Development Corporation
 West Side Stadium

References

External links

 Official website
 NYS Authorities Budget Office Public-Benefits Authorities page
 NYS OSC Public-Benefits Authorities page

1986 establishments in New York City
34th Street (Manhattan)
Buildings and structures completed in 1986
Convention centers in New York City
Economy of New York City
Empire State Development Corporation
Eleventh Avenue (Manhattan)
Event venues in Manhattan
Hell's Kitchen, Manhattan
Hospitals established for the COVID-19 pandemic
Hudson Yards, Manhattan
James Ingo Freed buildings
West Side Highway